Chaetosisyrops is a genus of bristle flies in the family Tachinidae.

Species
Chaetosisyrops montanus Townsend, 1912

Distribution
Peru.

References

Exoristinae
Tachinidae genera
Endemic fauna of Peru
Diptera of South America
Monotypic Brachycera genera
Taxa named by Charles Henry Tyler Townsend